The 2013 GT Asia Series season was the fourth season of the GT Asia Series championship. It began on 11 May at Twin Ring Motegi and finished on November 17 at the Guia Circuit after eleven races.

Race calendar and results

Championships
Points were awarded as follows:

Drivers Championship
Only the best 9 results counted for the drivers championship

Teams Championship

References

External links
Asian Festival Of Speed official website 

GT Asia Series seasons
GT Asia Series
GT Asia Series